Słodowiec is a neighbourhood, and an area of the Municipal Information System, in the city of Warsaw, Poland, located within the district of Bielany.

Name 
The name Słodowiec, comes from the word słód, which, in Polish means malt, and comes from the malt mill that was build in the area in the 19th century.

History 
Słodowiec originated as a part of the village of Buraków (now part of the city of Łomianki). Prior to 1830, the area was leased by the Agronomic and Forest Institute, and developed into an industrial area with a brickworks and a malt mill at the Rudawka river. In the second half of the 19th century, Słodowiec became a separate village. In 1860, in Słodowiec was build a steam mill.

On 8 April 1916, Słodowiec was incorporated into the city of Warsaw.

Public transport 
In the neighbourhood is located the Słodowiec metro station of the Line M1 of the Warsaw Metro.

References 

Slodowiec
Slodowiec